The 1929–30 Georgetown Hoyas men's basketball team represented Georgetown University during the 1929–30 NCAA college basketball season. Bill Dudack coached it in his first and only season as head coach. Georgetown was an independent and, after playing its first two games at Clendenen Gymnasium on the campus of American University in Washington, D.C. – its home court the previous season – played its home games at Tech Gymnasium on the campus of Washington, D.C.s McKinley Technical High School in Washington, D.C., the first Georgetown team to use Tech Gymnasium as its home court. It played one home game later in the season at Brookland Gymnasium on the campus of The Catholic University of America in Washington, D.C.

Season recap

Bill Dudack was a 1921 Georgetown graduate who had played for four years on the varsity basketball team, beginning with the 1917-18 season and had lettered for the 1918-19, 1919-20, and 1920-21 teams. He had also been captain of the 1919-1920 team. He had served as an assistant to head coach to Elmer Ripley during Ripleys two very successful seasons as the Hoyas head coach in 1927-28 and 1928-29. Dudack inherited a team stocked with veterans Ripley had recruited, leading to hopes that Ripleys success would continue under Dudack.

Senior guard and second-year team captain Fred Mesmer was an important defensive presence for the team during the season and led the Hoyas in scoring for the second straight year, averaging 9.2 points per game. He averaged 8.5 points per game over his collegiate career.

Senior center Don Dutton scored a career-high 20 points against Johns Hopkins on January 22, 1930, and averaged 8.0 points per game through 16 games before being declared academically ineligible for the rest of the year after mid-term examinations. He focused on his studies and graduated on time in the spring of 1930.

Despite the teams veteran talent and the winning tradition the school hoped Ripley had established during the previous two years, the 1929-30 Hoyas only managed a 13-12 record. Georgetown did not rehire Dudack for the following season.

Roster
Sources

Georgetown players did not wear numbers on their jerseys this season. The first numbered jerseys in Georgetown mens basketball history would not appear until the 1933-34 season.

Less than two years after graduating after the end of this season, senior guard Fred Mesmer would become Georgetowns head coach for the 1931-32 season and coach the Hoyas for seven seasons.

1929–30 schedule and results
Sources

It was common practice at this time for colleges and universities to include non-collegiate opponents in their schedules, with the games recognized as part of their official record for the season, and the games played against the Brooklyn Knights of Columbus, the Columbus Knights of Columbus, and the Crescent Athletic Club therefore counted as part of Georgetowns won-loss record for 1929-30. It was not until 1952, after the completion of the 1951-52 season, that the National Collegiate Athletic Association (NCAA) ruled that colleges and universities could no longer count games played against non-collegiate opponents in their annual won-loss records.

|-
!colspan=9 style="background:#002147; color:#8D817B;"| Regular Season

References

Georgetown Hoyas men's basketball seasons
Georgetown
Georgetown Hoyas men's basketball team
Georgetown Hoyas men's basketball team